Crocidosema insulana is a species of moth of the family Tortricidae. It is found in Chile in Santiago, Masatierra Island, Coquimbo, Valparaiso, Maule and Bío Bío.

References

Moths described in 1922
Eucosmini
Endemic fauna of Chile